The South Wales Premiership is the league for amateur clubs in southern Wales. Previously it was part of the Rugby League Conference but became standalone in 2012.

History

The Rugby League Conference was founded in 1997 as the Southern Conference, a 10-team pilot league for teams in the South of England and English Midlands. It expanded into Wales for the first time in 2001 when Cardiff Demons joined the South West division.

After two years of just one club in South Wales, the RFL saw that it was time to expand, letting in six more open-aged sides to form the new Welsh Conference and Wales gained its own division for the first time.

The Premier Division were set up in 2005 for teams who had achieved a certain playing standard and were able to travel further afield to find stronger opposition. The new Premier Divisions included the North Premier, the South Premier, the Central Premier and the Welsh Premier.

The Welsh Premier division was split into two divisions East Wales and West Wales in 2006, though this decision was reversed for the following season.

The Welsh Conference Junior League began in 2009.

Due to the growth of the sport in Wales, in 2010 a separate Championship division was formed which would function at one tier lower than the present Premier division. This Championship division featured teams from South Wales, but another Championship division featuring teams from North Wales was meant to be contested, but it didn't materialise and a rugby league nines tournament was played instead.

The South Wales Rugby League Championship was given a re-structure following four West Wales clubs not fulfilling fixtures. Amman Valley Rhinos, Dinefwr Sharks, Swansea/Llanelli Dragons and West Wales Wild Boars were omitted and replaced with newly formed Dyffryn Devils.

In 2012 the league became a standalone South Wales Premiership and the lower Championship division was abolished.

Rugby League Conference Pyramid

 National Conference League
 South Wales Premiership

2014
Aber Valley Wolves, Bridgend Blue Bulls, Cardiff Demons, Cardiff Spartans, Gwendraeth Valley Raiders, Newport Titans, Torfaen Tigers, Valley Cougars A

2013
Premier Division: Bonymaen Broncos, Borderer Boars, Cardiff Demons, Newport Titans, Torfaen Tigers, Valley Cougars. Bridgend Blue Bulls and Blackwood Bulldogs entered but failed to start the season. Borderer Boars failed to complete the season
South Wales Merit Table: Cardiff Demons B, Cardiff Spartans, Gwendraeth Valley Raiders, Torfaen Tigers B

2012

Teams

NB: Blackwood Bulldogs and Tydfil Wildcats failed to start the season. Cardiff Demons, Titans and Dyffryn Devils failed to complete the season.

Teams play each other on a home-and-away basis. Each Premier division then has its own play-off series to determine the champion with the five divisional winners entering the national play-offs.
The winner of the national play-offs is awarded the Harry Jepson Trophy.

League standings

 1 competed as West Wales Sharks between 2006 and 2008
 2 competed as Aberavon Fighting Irish between 2003 and 2006
 3 competed as Swansea Bulls in 2003
 4 competed as Cynon Valley Cougars in 2003

Key

Winners

Competed for by the RLC Wales division since 2003

 2003 Bridgend Blue Bulls
 2004 Bridgend Blue Bulls
 2005 Bridgend Blue Bulls
 2006 Bridgend Blue Bulls
 2007 Bridgend Blue Bulls
 2008 Valley Cougars
 2009 Blackwood Bulldogs 
 2010 Valley Cougars
 2011 Bridgend Blue Bulls
 2012 Bonymaen Broncos
 2013 Torfaen Tigers
 2014 Bridgend Blue Bulls
 2015 Bridgend Blue Bulls
 2016 Bridgend Blue Bulls
 2017 Valley Cougars
 2018 Valley Cougars
 2019 Rhondda Outlaws
 2020 Cancelled (Covid-19)
 2021 Bridgend Blue Bulls
 2022 Rhondda Outlaws

Welsh Shield

Secondary Welsh competition for teams who do not make the play-offs for the Welsh Premier. It has not been contested since 2005.

 2004 Cardiff Demons
 2005 Newport Titans (now Titans RLFC)

Plate Final

 2009 Newport Titans (now Titans RLFC) 32 Dinefwr Sharks 24

Junior league
Welsh teams also compete at under-17; under-15 and under-13 age groups.

External links
 Official Wales Rugby League website

Rugby league in Wales
Rugby League Conference
Sports leagues established in 2003
Rugby league competitions in the United Kingdom